The Drug Addicts (Los Drogadictos) is a 1979 Argentine comedy film drama directed by Enrique Carreras.

Cast

Graciela Alfano
Luis Aranda
Giancarlo Arena
Héctor Armendáriz
Jacques Arndt
Vicente Buono
Juan José Camero
Mercedes Carreras
Rudy Carrié
Luis Corradi
Hector Doldi
Carlos Estrada
Raúl Florido
Ricardo Greco
Ricardo Jordán
Juan Carlos Lamas
Norma López Monet
Mario Lozano
Carlos Luzzieti
Constanza Maral
Adrián Martel
Aldo Mayo
Héctor Méndez
Rodolfo Onetto
Adriana Parets
Mario Pasik
Oscar Pedemonti
Joaquín Piñón
Oscar Roy
Abel Sáenz Buhr
Jorge Salcedo
Jorge Sassi
Ricardo Suñe
Nino Udine
Myriam de Urquijo
Gonzalo Urtizberéa
Carlos Vanoni
Orlando Zumpano
Dobo Jacobo

External links
 

1979 films
Argentine comedy films
1970s Spanish-language films
1979 comedy films
1970s Argentine films
Films directed by Enrique Carreras